Autar Kaw is a professor of mechanical engineering at the University of South Florida. In 2012, he won the U.S Professor of the Year award from the Carnegie Foundation for Advancement of Teaching and the Council for Advancement and Support of Education. Kaw's main scholarly interests are in education research methods, open courseware development, flipped and adaptive learning, and the state and future of higher education.

Education 
In 1981, Kaw completed BE Honors in Mechanical Engineering from the Birla Institute of Technology and Science (BITS) in India. He joined Clemson University for MS and Ph.D. in Engineering Mechanics.

Career 
In 1987, he joined the University of South Florida. Since 2002, the National Science Foundation, a United States government agency, funded the development and implementation of an open courseware in Numerical Methods under the leadership of Kaw. The open courseware receives 1.8 million view on YouTube annually. He is the author of various books.

He is a Fellow of the American Society of Mechanical Engineers. He is a member of American Society of Engineering Education and National Academy of Inventors  He is one of the two founding members of the USF College of Engineering Academy of Distinguished Engineering Educators. In 2018, he visited UTP, Malaysia as a Fulbright Specialist candidate. He conducted several educational workshops on topics including MOOCs, flipped learning, improving student classroom performance, and the scholarship of teaching and learning.

Awards

References

External links 
Numerical Methods Guy Blog
Autar Kaw - Personal Website

Living people
University of South Florida faculty
1960 births